The Kanin class were a class of destroyers of the Soviet Navy during the Cold War. The Soviet designation was Project 57A Gnevny (not to be confused with the World War II era Project 7). These ships were the first Soviet guided missile destroyers and were initially designated Project 57bis (or 57b) and known to NATO as the Krupny class. Their primary mission was anti-surface warfare using the SS-N-1 anti-ship missile

Design 
Designed from as gun armed destroyers with 3 pairs of 130mm guns, their layout was completed in 1956. Their initial purpose was surface engagement with opposing naval vessels and shore targets. The SS-N-1 missile installed in this class for that specific mission. The destroyers carried two launchers for the SS-N-1, one located at each end of the ship, each magazine holding six additional missiles.

The superstructure was made of steel rather than the aluminium/ magnesium alloy of the Kotlin class ships and accommodation was significantly improved.

Criticisms of the class include that they had limited self-defence weaponry and that their main weapon, the SS-N-1 was soon obsolescent after introduction.

ASW conversion 

The limitations of the SS-N-1 missile were clear by 1965 and the Soviet Navy decided to convert the ships to a more general purpose / ASW role. These ships were called the Kanin class by NATO. This involved providing the destroyers with a new bow sonar, MG-332 Titan-2 that controlled two quintuple torpedo tubes and three RBU-6000s. To clear the bow sonar also required that the bow be extended . A helicopter pad was installed aft that allowed the ships to operate a Kamov Ka-25 helicopter.

To improve the destroyers self-defence, launchers firing SA-N-1 anti-air missiles were installed along with two quadruple-mounted 57mm guns. All of these installations required more power and hence, the diesel generator was upgraded to 500 kW and a second generator of that capability was installed.

According to Conway's the modernisation proved very expensive and appeared to have deterred the Soviets from any further comprehensive rebuilding of older ships.

Operations

In May 1975, to commemorate the 30th anniversary of Victory in Europe, Boyky and Zhguchy made a five-day visit to Boston, Massachusetts. This was the first post-war visit by a Soviet naval ship to the United States.

Ships

See also
List of ships of the Soviet Navy
List of ships of Russia by project number

Notes

References

In Russian

External links

Page from Navycollection 

 
Destroyer classes
Ships of the Soviet Navy